Elyria Township may refer to one of the following places in the United States:

 Elyria Township, Valley County, Nebraska
 Elyria Township, Lorain County, Ohio

Township name disambiguation pages